The Jinan–Zaozhuang high-speed railway is a high-speed railway under planning in Shandong, China. Construction of the line had been expected to start in April 2021, and be completed in 2024. However, in April 2021, it was announced that the project had been postponed.

Stations

References

High-speed railway lines in China